My Love Is a Bulldozer is the twentieth studio album by breakcore artist Venetian Snares released on June 16, 2014.

Track listing 
 "10th Circle of Winnipeg" – 7:00
 "Deleted Poems" – 3:13
 "1000 Years" – 6:13
 "Your Smiling Face" – 3:05
 "Amazon" – 4:05
 "My Love Is a Bulldozer" – 5:08
 "She Runs" – 7:05
 "8am Union Station" – 1:41
 "Shaky Sometimes" – 3:32
 "Too Far Across" – 2:46
 "Dear Poet" – 6:47
 "Your Blanket" – 3:07

References

2014 albums
Venetian Snares albums
Planet Mu albums